Communist Party – Red Star (in Spanish: Partido Comunista - Estrella Roja) was a splinter group of the Peruvian Communist Party that appeared in the beginnings of the 1970s in Peru. PC-ER opposed participation in elections.

It is no longer active.

See also
 Communist Party of Ecuador - Red Sun
 Communist Party of Peru - Red Fatherland
 Peruvian Communist Party (Red Flag)
 Revolutionary Communist Party - Red Trench, in Peru

References

Communist parties in Peru
Political schisms